The  Milwaukee Mustangs season is the third season for the franchise, and the second in the Arena Football League (AFL). This is the first season for the team as the Mustangs, having previously been known as the Milwaukee Iron. The team is coached by Bob Landsee and plays their home games at Bradley Center. The Mustangs finished 7–11, missing the playoffs.

Standings

Regular season schedule
The Mustangs began the season at home against the Chicago Rush on March 14, and concluded the season against the Rush in Chicago on July 23.

Regular season

Week 1: vs. Chicago Rush

Week 2: at Arizona Rattlers

Week 3: vs. Pittsburgh Power

Week 4: vs. Philadelphia Soul

Week 5: BYE

Week 6: at Dallas Vigilantes

Week 7: vs. Georgia Force

Week 8: vs. Tampa Bay Storm

Week 9: at Cleveland Gladiators

Week 10: at Utah Blaze

Week 11: BYE

Week 12: vs. Orlando Predators

Week 13: at Philadelphia Soul

Week 14: vs. Kansas City Command

Week 15: at Jacksonville Sharks

Week 16: at Pittsburgh Power

Week 17: vs. Cleveland Gladiators

Week 18: at New Orleans VooDoo

Week 19: vs. Iowa Barnstormers

Week 20: at Chicago Rush

References

Milwaukee Mustangs
Milwaukee Mustangs (2009–2012) seasons